"A New England" is a song written and recorded by Billy Bragg, included on his album Life's a Riot with Spy Vs Spy, released in 1983. It remains a signature song from the early years of Bragg's recording career.

In 1985, a cover version by Kirsty MacColl became a hit single.

Background and composition
The opening lines of the song ("I was 21 years when I wrote this song/I'm 22 now, but I won't be for long") are identical to the opening lines of Paul Simon's song "Leaves That Are Green", which appears on Simon and Garfunkel's 1966 album Sounds of Silence. During a concert in Winnipeg, Canada, on 26 September 2006, Bragg stated Simon and Garfunkel had a strong influence on him.

Bragg has said the song had its origins in seeing two satellites flying alongside each other. Searching for romantic inspiration, he had to make do with "space hardware". He told a BBC interviewer he "stole" the melody from Thin Lizzy's "Cowboy Song".

Kirsty MacColl version

Kirsty MacColl recorded the song the year after its release by Bragg. Her version was produced by her then husband Steve Lillywhite. Entering the UK chart in 1985, it was her biggest solo hit, reaching number 7 in the UK Singles Chart and number 8 in the Irish Singles Chart.

Bragg's original version of the song had only two verses. MacColl thought the song was too short, and so Bragg wrote a further verse for her.  The line in the chorus "I'm just looking for another girl" becomes a question: "Are you looking for another girl?" Since MacColl's death, Bragg has included the additional verse in performances of the song as a tribute.

The recording of "A New England" was the first collaboration between MacColl and her husband Steve Lillywhite on one of her own solo recordings.

Background
MacColl discovered Bragg in 1983 when she went to see one of his live performances. One of the songs Bragg played was "A New England", which MacColl immediately identified as having hit potential. MacColl told Smash Hits in 1985, "I always thought 'A New England' would be great with loads of harmonies, it's such a good melody. Billy does it in a very rough way, and it's like a busker doing a really good Beatles song." She added to Gilbert Blecken in 1994, "I knew the song was fantastic, but [Bragg's] version was just the skeleton of the song, so I wanted to dress it up."

Music video
MacColl recalled to Record Mirror in 1985, "It was hell making the video, I was seven months pregnant and it was shot out in the freezing cold."

Critical reception
On its release, Richard Cook of New Musical Express wrote, "Bragg's 'A New England' proves to be a skimming and vivacious vehicle for MacColl and the song checks for the pop sense of composer and singer; but Lillywhite's production might be too clever where it needs a simple stroke, unassuming when it needs to strike clear and hard." Mike Gardiner of Record Mirror stated that MacColl had "admirably tenderised the Billy Bragg original without weakening one of last year's better love songs". He noted the "smart production", the "Byrds-style 12-string guitar backing" and "some velvet choral effects". Frank Edmonds of the Bury Free Press gave the single a 6 out of 10 rating. He described it as a "fast, bright pop song", but did not believe it would become a hit.

Track listing

7-inch and picture disc

12-inch

Charts

References

External links
 

1984 singles
Kirsty MacColl songs
Billy Bragg songs
1983 songs
Songs written by Billy Bragg
Song recordings produced by Steve Lillywhite
Songs about England
Songs about the United Kingdom